8 mm or 8mm may refer to:
Film technology
8 mm film, a photographic cine film format principally intended for domestic use. The term may also refer to later variants:
 Super 8 mm film
 Single-8 film
 8 mm video format, a type of video recorder and tape that is primarily used in camcorders, including Video 8 and Hi 8
 Digital8 video tape format

Firearms
 8 mm caliber, ammunition with bullet in the 8 mm (.315 in) caliber range
 7.92×57mm Mauser "8 mm Mauser cartridge" – a rifle cartridge originating in Germany (though not designed by the Mauser company)

Other uses
 8mm (band), pop-rock band from Los Angeles, California
 8mm (film), about a private detective trying to verify the authenticity of a snuff film
 8mm 2, film (aka The Velvet Side of Hell), a sexual tryst of a young pair becomes a personal issue when they are blackmailed